This article lists diplomatic missions resident in and accredited to the Belarus. The capital city of Minsk hosts 50 embassies.

Embassies 
Embassies in Minsk:

Gallery of embassies in Minsk

Missions/Offices 

 (Liaison Office)
 (Office)

Consulates-General/Consulates

Brest

Grodno

Vitebsk
 (Consulate)

Accredited embassies 
Resident in Moscow unless otherwise noted

Former embassies

Former missions 
 (Consultate-General in Brest, closed in March 2022)

See also 
 List of diplomatic missions of Belarus
 Visa requirements for Belarusian citizens

References

External links 
 Foreign diplomatic missions in Belarus

List
Belarus
Diplomatic missions